Iakob Kajaia (born September 28, 1993) is a Georgian Greco-Roman wrestler. He competed in the men's Greco-Roman 130 kg event at the 2016 Summer Olympics, in which he was eliminated in the quarterfinals by Sergey Semenov. He is a European bronze medallist (2018).

He lost his bronze medal match in the 130 kg event at the 2022 World Wrestling Championships held in Belgrade, Serbia.

Major results

References

External links

 

1993 births
Living people
People from Imereti
Male sport wrestlers from Georgia (country)
Olympic wrestlers of Georgia (country)
Wrestlers at the 2016 Summer Olympics
Wrestlers at the 2015 European Games
Wrestlers at the 2019 European Games
European Games medalists in wrestling
European Games gold medalists for Georgia (country)
World Wrestling Championships medalists
European Wrestling Championships medalists
Wrestlers at the 2020 Summer Olympics
Medalists at the 2020 Summer Olympics
Olympic medalists in wrestling
Olympic silver medalists for Georgia (country)
20th-century people from Georgia (country)
21st-century people from Georgia (country)